Tylko miłość (Only Love) is a Polish drama television series, broadcast on Polsat from September 13, 2007 to September 20, 2009.

Plot 
The series follows the fortunes of Rafał Rozner, 30-year-old architect who, after the death of his wife bringing up a daughter Lusia. He lives in the huge house on the outskirts of Warsaw, with his daughter, nanny, housekeeper and unfulfilled painter – brother Wiktor. His life is changing one evening when spending time in the bar meets rising pop star, Sylwia. After spending the night together Rafał and Sylwia become lovers, however, and is not satisfied until he Rozner on its way becoming a Lusia's teacher, Maja Kryńska.

Cast

References

External links 
Tylko miłość at IMDb
Official profile in Filmpolski.pl database

2007 Polish television series debuts
Polish drama television series
Polsat original programming